La Historia De Mi Vida: El Final, Vol 1 (English: The Story Of My Life: The Finale, Vol. 1) is the twenty-third studio album by Dominican singer Anthony Santos. The album included Wason Brazobán, Mozart La Para, Milly Quezada. It also included Bachata artists Zacarías Ferreira, and Romeo Santos.

Singles
On Its first single, "Que Vuelvas", was released on June 28, 2018. It peaked at #12 on the Billboard Tropical Airplay. 

The second single, "Bellas", was released on August 1, 2018. It featured the The Bronx-born bachata singer, Romeo Santos. This was one of many songs they have done together. The song would also be featured on Romeo's fourth studio album Utopía (2019). 

On June 28, 2019, Anthony released "Se Acabó El Abuso". It was not included in the album, but it was released as a continuation or a bonus single of it. The title and cover of the single had the album's title on the song title. It peaked #12 on the Billboard Tropical Airplay.

Track listing

Charts

References 

2018 albums
Antony Santos albums
Latin music albums
Spanish-language albums